Harold William Henry, S.S.C., 현 하롤드, (July 11, 1909 – March 1, 1976) was an American-born Catholic missionary and bishop. As a member of the Missionary Society of St. Columban he was assigned to missions in South Korea. He served as the Prefect of Kwangju from 1954 to 1957, Vicar Apostolic of Kwangju  from 1957 to 1962, the first Archbishop of Gwangju from 1962 to 1971, and as the Apostolic Administrator of Cheju from 1971 to 1976.

Biography
Born in Northfield, Minnesota, Harold Henry was ordained a priest on December 21, 1932, for the Missionary Society of St. Columban. Pope Pius XII named him as the Apostolic Prefect of Kwangju in 1954. On January 26, 1957, he was named the titular bishop of Corydala and Vicar Apostolic of Kwangju. Henry was consecrated a bishop on May 11, 1957, by Archbishop Richard Cushing of Boston. The principal co-consecrators were Bishop John Wright of Worcester and Boston Auxiliary Bishop Jeremiah Minihan. Pope John XXIII named him as the Archbishop of Gwangju on March 10, 1962. He attended three of the four sessions of the Second Vatican Council (1962–1965). Pope Paul VI named Henry the Apostolic Administrator of the Diocese of Cheju on June 28, 1971. On the same date he was transferred to the titular see of Thubunae in Numidia. Henry died on March 1, 1976, at the age of 66.

References

1909 births
1976 deaths
Clergy from Minneapolis
Missionary Society of St. Columban
American Roman Catholic missionaries
Roman Catholic missionaries in South Korea
20th-century Roman Catholic archbishops in South Korea
20th-century American Roman Catholic titular bishops
Participants in the Second Vatican Council
Roman Catholic archbishops of Gwangju
American emigrants to South Korea
Roman Catholic bishops of Cheju
Roman Catholic bishops of Gwangju